Catarina Cardoso Garcia da Fonseca Furtado (born 25 August 1972) is a Portuguese television presenter, actress and UNFPA Goodwill Ambassador. Catarina was born in Lisbon and is a daughter of RTP journalist Joaquim Furtado.

Career
Throughout her career on television which started in the early 1990s, she has worked for SIC and RTP television networks, as well as the radio stations Rádio Comercial and RDP Antena 3. While an underage girl, Catarina had a short non-talking role in the film Non, ou a Vã Glória de Mandar directed by Manoel de Oliveira. Later on she starred in films like Killing Time (an English film that appeared in the Cannes Film Festival), Fatima (an Italian movie by Fabrizio Costa), Anjo da Guarda and Pesadelo cor-de-rosa, among others.

Catarina's first big success was as a presenter on the TV show Top + on RTP, a Portuguese program featuring popular music videos and the national weekly record chart. It was a music show that led to her hosting a MTV Portugal program on the SIC network, years before Portuguese MTV was founded. She went on to do a variety of shows, including Treasure Hunt (Caça ao Tesouro), on SIC television, which was often shot on location in Portugal's smaller towns, where Catarina arrived in a helicopter.

On January 8, 2018, she was announced as one of the four hosts of the 2018 Eurovision Song Contest alongside Sílvia Alberto, Daniela Ruah, and Filomena Cautela.

Personal life
Catarina attended the Conservatório Nacional (until 1990) specializing in dance. She also trained in journalism and studied drama at London's International School of Acting from 1995 to 1997, as well as Lee Strasberg's Method Studio in England. She is married to João Reis, an actor, and has a daughter, Maria Beatriz (born in 2006) and a son, João Maria (born in 2007). Catarina Furtado is rated on the site AskMen.com.

Films and television

 Eurovision Song Contest 2018
 Filhos do Rock (2013–14)
 The Voice Portugal (2011–present)
 Cidade Despida (2010)
 Dá-me Música
 A minha geração (2008)
 Dança Comigo (2006–07)
 Pequenos em Grande (2005)
 Operação Triunfo (2003)
 Pequenos e Terríveis (1999)
 Uma Noite de Sonho (1995)
 Caça ao Tesouro (1994)
 Chuva de Estrelas (1993)
 MTV Portugal (1992)
 Top + (1991/1992)
 Gala Globos de Ouro
 As Mais Belas Canções de Natal
 SIC No País do Natal
 Gala Portugal Fashion
 Uma Aventura
 O Lampião da Estrela
 Catarina.com
 Fátima
 A Ferreirinha
 Natal dos Hospitais

See also
 List of Eurovision Song Contest presenters

References

External links

Portuguese television presenters
Portuguese actresses
Portuguese people of Goan descent
1972 births
Living people
Actresses from Lisbon
Portuguese women television presenters